Bohdan Gonsior (born 16 February 1937) is a Polish fencer. He won a bronze medal in the team épée event at the 1968 Summer Olympics.

References

1937 births
Living people
Polish male fencers
Olympic fencers of Poland
Fencers at the 1960 Summer Olympics
Fencers at the 1964 Summer Olympics
Fencers at the 1968 Summer Olympics
Fencers at the 1972 Summer Olympics
Olympic bronze medalists for Poland
Olympic medalists in fencing
Sportspeople from Chorzów
Medalists at the 1968 Summer Olympics
Universiade medalists in fencing
Universiade gold medalists for Poland
20th-century Polish people
21st-century Polish people